Owen Bradford "Brad" Butler was an American businessperson.

Early life and family
Butler was born in Lynchburg, Virginia. He was married to Erna Butler, and they had two children.

Career
Butler joined Procter & Gamble in 1945. After a few years, he became the head of soap department of the company. In 1967, he became head of the food division and a year later, in 1968, he became a vice president.

In 1972, Butler became a member of the board of directors.

In 1981, Butler became the chairman of Procter & Gamble and served until 1986. A year later, he joined the National Committee for Economic Development as its chairman.

References

1998 deaths
American businesspeople
Procter & Gamble people